In the run up to the 2023 Cypriot presidential election, various organisations carried out opinion polling to gauge voting intention in Cyprus. Results of such polls are displayed in this article. The date range for these opinion polls is from 9 May 2022 to 26 January 2023.

Poll results are listed in the tables below in reverse chronological order, showing the most recent first and using the date the survey's fieldwork was done, as opposed to the date of publication. If such date is unknown, the date of publication is given instead. The first line lists the actual election results for the first round, on 5 February 2023. The highest percentage figure in each polling survey is displayed in bold, and the background shaded in the leading party's colour. In the instance that there is a tie, then no figure is shaded. The lead column on the right shows the percentage-point difference between the two candidates with the highest figures. When a specific poll does not show a data figure for a candidate, the candidate's cell corresponding to that poll is shown empty.

First round

Graph

Table

Second round

Averof Neofytou – Nikos Christodoulides

Andreas Mavroyiannis – Nikos Christodoulides

Averof Neofytou – Andreas Mavroyiannis

Notes

2023 Cypriot presidential election
2023 presidential